Zamia ipetiensis is a species of plant in the family Zamiaceae. It is endemic to Panama, where it is found near the town of Ipetí, Kuna de Madugandí. It is threatened by habitat loss. Only two wild subpopulations remain.

References

Flora of Panama
ipetiensis
Vulnerable plants
Taxonomy articles created by Polbot